The 2017 Carlton Football Club season was the Carlton Football Club's 154th season of competition.

It was the club's men's team's 121st season as a member of the Australian Football League. The team finished sixteenth out of eighteen teams in the 2017 AFL season with a win–loss record of 6–16.

The season saw the inauguration of the club's women's team, which contested its first season as a member of the AFL Women's competition. The team finished fourth out of eight teams in the 2017 AFL Women's season with a 3–3–1 record from seven games.

Club summary
The 2017 AFL season was the 121st season of the VFL/AFL competition since its inception in 1897; and, having competed in every season, it was also the 121th season contested by the Carlton Football Club. Carlton continued its alignment with the Northern Blues in the Victorian Football League, allowing Carlton-listed players to play with the Northern Blues when not selected in AFL matches. Carlton's primary home ground continued to be the Melbourne Cricket Ground, with the club playing six home matches there and five at Etihad Stadium; traditional home ground Ikon Park continued to serve as the training and administrative base.

The club also fielded its women's team in the inaugural season of the AFL Women's competition, running in February and March. Carlton was one of four Victorian clubs granted a license in June 2016 for the eight-team competition. Ikon Park served as the home ground for women's matches.

The club's membership was 50,326, a 0.3% increase on the 2016 season. Car manufacturer Hyundai continued as one of the club's two major sponsorship partners in 2017, having been a major sponsor continuously since 2008. The club's second major sponsorship partner at the beginning of the season was job seekers' services provider CareerOne, which was in the final year of a three-year deal; however, the company withdrew from the sponsorship during May after cash flow difficulties related to a federal government audit of one of its clients. In late May, the club signed airline Virgin Australia, which was already in a secondary level sponsorship deal with the club, as the replacement for CareerOne, with the Virgin logo replacing the CareerOne logo on the team's guernseys from Round 10 onwards. The club posted a $700,000 profit for the year, its first profit since the 2013 season.

Senior Personnel
Mark LoGiudice continued as club president, a role he had held since June 2014. Marc Murphy continued in the role of captain for the fifth season; Kade Simpson remained vice-captain. There was one change to the club's seven-man leadership group, with Dennis Armfield elevated to the group to fill the position left by the retirement of Andrew Walker, and Ed Curnow, Bryce Gibbs, Patrick Cripps and Sam Docherty holding their places. Former  women's exhibition series senior coach Damien Keeping joined the club as the coach of the women's team.

Squad for 2017
The following is Carlton's squad for the 2017 season.

Statistics are correct as of end of 2017 season.
Flags represent the state of origin, i.e. the state in which the player played his Under-18s football.

For players: (c) denotes captain, (vc) denotes vice-captain, (dvc) denotes deputy vice-captain, (lg) denotes leadership group.
For coaches: (s) denotes senior coach, (cs) denotes caretaker senior coach, (a) denotes assistant coach, (d) denotes development coach, (m) denotes managerial or administrative role in a football or coaching department

Playing list changes
The following summarises all player changes which have occurred since the conclusion of the 2016 season. Unless otherwise noted, draft picks refer to selections in the 2016 AFL draft.

Two high-profile players requested trades away from Carlton in the lead-up to the trade period: Zach Tuohy and Bryce Gibbs. Gibbs was two years into a five-year contract, but sought a return to Adelaide for family reasons, nominating the Adelaide Crows as his preferred destination. Tuohy, out of contract but not a free agent, nominated  as his preferred destination. Carlton was also linked to young out-of-contract  defender Caleb Marchbank, who was seeking to return to his home state Victoria and nominated Carlton as his preferred destination. In the end, deals were secured for Tuohy and Marchbank, but Carlton and Adelaide could not come to an agreement on a trade for Gibbs and he remained on the Carlton list.

In

Out

List management

Season summary

Practice matches
The club played three practice matches as part of the JLT Community Series.

Home and away season
The club entered the season continuing to rebuild its playing list under a youth policy, and thus despite having won seven games in 2016, the club was expected to fare poorly, with about half of all pundits across the major newspapers and media outlets predicting the club would finish last. The club eventually finished with a 6–16 record, one fewer win than in 2016, to finish sixteenth, one win and percentage ahead of wooden spooners .

As in 2016, the club was stronger in the first half of the year than the second, sitting with win–loss records of 3–4 after Round 7 and 4–7 after Round 13, before winning only one of its final ten games. The club's win–loss formline when compared to its opponents' finishing position was unusually erratic, with the club finishing:
2–6 against the top six.
3–6 against teams ranked seventh to thirteenth, with no losing margin heavier than four goals against those teams
1–4 against the other four teams in the bottom five, with three of the four losses heavier than four goals and the only win coming against 
Carlton was usually able to keep close in its games, and led at least ten minutes into the final quarter in eight of its sixteen losses.

Its biggest weakness was its inability to score, and the club was the lowest-scoring in the league (having been second-lowest in 2016 behind suspension-affected ) and failed to score 100 points in any game for the first time since 1917.

Team awards and records
Game records and awards
Round 3 – Carlton laid a total of 111 tackles against Essendon, the most tackles ever laid by the club in a single game; the record was aided by the wet weather, with such conditions always conducive to high tackling games.
Round 3 – with scoring affected by heavy rain which fell throughout the game, Carlton's score of 7.15 (57) was its lowest winning score since Round 12, 1989, and Essendon's score of 6.6 (42) was the lowest score Carlton had conceded since Round 22, 2001.
Round 3 – the club won the Madden Cup as winners of its rivalry game against Essendon.
Round 7 – the club won the Peter Mac Cup as winners of its rivalry game against Collingwood.
Round 22 – the club defeated  for the first time since Round 6, 2005, ending a fourteen-game losing streak. It was the club's equal-longest VFL/AFL losing streak against a single opponent, matching the fourteen game losing streak against  in 1897–1902.
The club failed to record a score of 100 or higher in any match in 2017, the first such season since the 1917 season.

Other notes
Round 3 – the club debuted an alternative guernsey known as the "Blueout Guernsey" against Essendon. Intended as a tribute to the suburb of Carlton, the guernsey design matched the home guernsey, except that the monogram and numbers were navy blue with a white outline, and the guernsey was finished with a subtle pattern representing bluestone.
Round 7 – the away match against  was staged to celebrate the 125th anniversary of Collingwood's inaugural senior premiership game, played against Carlton in the 1892 VFA season.

Individual awards and records

John Nicholls Medal
The Carlton Football Club Best and Fairest awards night took place on 22 September. The John Nicholls Medal, for the best and fairest player of the club, as well as several other awards, were presented on the night.

John Nicholls Medal
The winner of the John Nicholls Medal was Marc Murphy, who polled 174 votes to beat 2016 winner Sam Docherty (169 votes) and Matthew Kreuzer (164 votes). It was Murphy's second John Nicholls Medal, having first won the medal six years earlier in 2011. Matthew Kreuzer's third placing was the best performance of this career, and he also swept the coterie group awards. Also notable was the ninth-placing of Liam Jones, who in his first season as a defender polled 84 votes from only twelve games – a votes-per-game average which would have been high enough for fourth place had been played the entire season – and the seventh- and tenth-placings of Lachie Plowman and Charlie Curnow, who reached the count's top ten for the first times in their careers.

Other awards
The following other awards were presented on John Nicholls Medal night:-
Best First-Year Player – Sam Petrevski-Seton
Best Clubman – Dennis Armfield
Spirit of Carlton Award – Matthew Kreuzer
Bill Lanyon Inner Blue Ruthless Award – Matthew Kreuzer
Carltonians William A. Cook Award – Matthew Kreuzer
Hyundai MVP Award (the most valuable player as voted by fans in an online poll) – Sam Docherty and Marc Murphy

Records
Round 13 – in the match against , Bryce Gibbs accumulated 43 disposals, the most by a Carlton player since Gibbs' 45 disposals against  in Round 10, 2010; including 31 kicks, the most by a Carlton player since Scott Camporeale's 31 kicks against  in Round 6, 2000.
Season – Sam Docherty led all players in the AFL in both kicks (460) and marks (199) across the home-and-away season.

Leading goalkickers 
Levi Casboult was Carlton's leading goalkicker for the season with 34 goals. It was Casboult's first time finishing as the club's leading goalkicker after having been the second highest goalkicker in 2015 and 2016. 2016 leading goalkicker Matthew Wright was second.

Other awards
NAB AFL Rising Star
Five Carlton players were nominated for the 2017 AFL Rising Star award. This was the most ever nominated in a single season in the club, exceeding the three players nominated in 2003. Two of those players polled votes in the final count: Charlie Curnow, who was fourth with 27 votes, and Sam Petrevski-Seton, who was sixth with 3 votes. The nominees were:
Round 6 – Caleb Marchbank (nominated)
Round 7 – Sam Petrevski-Seton – 3 votes (sixth place)
Round 12 – David Cuningham (nominated)
Round 13 – Jack Silvagni (nominated)
Round 16 – Charlie Curnow – 27 votes (fourth place)

Representative honours
The following Carlton players were selected for representative teams during the 2017 season.
In the 2017 International Rules Series, for Australia:  Kade Simpson

Honorific teams
All-Australian team – Sam Docherty was named on the half-back flank in the All-Australian team. It was Docherty's first All-Australian team selection, having also been nominated in the 40-man squad in 2016, and he was the first Carlton player since 2011 to be selected in the final 22. Matthew Kreuzer was also nominated in the 40-man squad.
22under22 team – Charlie Curnow was named at centre half-forward in the 2017 22under22 team. Patrick Cripps was also nominated in the 40-man squad but was not voted into the final team.

AFLPA Awards
For each of the AFLPA awards, one or three Carlton players were nominated by an internal vote of Carlton players; Marc Murphy was also nominated for the Best Captain award by default. Sam Petrevski-Seton placed third for the best first-year player award.

Leigh Matthews Trophy (Most Valuable Player)
Sam Docherty (nominated)
Marc Murphy (nominated)
Kade Simpson (nominated)
Robert Rose Award (Most Courageous Player)
Matthew Kreuzer (nominated)
Best First Year Player
Sam Petrevski-Seton (third place, 48 votes)

Other awards
Round 22 – Sam Docherty won the Parkin Medal as best on ground in the match against .

Women's team

Squad
Under the competition's player recruitment regulations, each of the eight clubs was entitled to sign two marquee players. In July 2016, Carlton recruited St Kilda Sharks key position/midfielder and former Australian international soccer goalkeeper Brianna Davey and Darebin Falcons full forward Darcy Vescio as its marquee players. Darebin midfielder Lauren Arnell also signed with the club as a priority signing due to her pre-existing relationship with the club as its Female Football Ambassador. The club drew most of its remaining recruits from the inaugural AFL Women's draft, with Cranbourne forward Bianca Jakobsson taken with Carlton's first round selection at No. 3 overall. Arnell was made the inaugural captain of the team, with Davey and Madeline Keryk serving as vice-captains.

The following is the final senior squad as announced at the start of the season. Numbers in parentheses represent games played and goals kicked for Carlton in the season. Only supplementary players who played a senior match during the season are listed.

Season
The club played each of the other seven clubs once in the home-and-away series of the inaugural AFL Women's fixture over February and March. The main highlight of the fixture was the Round 1 match against Collingwood, which saw the two traditional men's rivals play the first match in the new competition's history. The match, for which admission was free, drew a lockout crowd of 24,568 at Ikon Park, after having originally been scheduled for Collingwood's 5,000-capacity Olympic Park training oval then being transferred due to the expected crowd. The team's Round 4, 5 and 6 matches against Melbourne, Fremantle and the Western Bulldogs served as curtain-raisers to the senior team's pre-season practice matches against the same clubs.

The club finished fourth out of eight on the ladder, with a final record of 3–3–1.

The following individual awards were won by Carlton players:
Brianna Davey won the club's inaugural AFLW best and fairest award with 53 votes. Davey finished ahead of Danielle Hardiman (31 votes) and Alison Downie (28 votes).
Darcy Vescio was the league's leading goalkicker, kicking 14 goals to finish three goals ahead of Sarah Perkins
Brianna Davey and Darcy Vescio were the only two Carlton players named in the All-Australian Team.
Darcy Vescio won the league's Mark of the Year award.

Northern Blues 
The Carlton Football Club had a full affiliation with the Northern Blues during the 2017 season. It was the fifteenth season of the clubs' affiliation, which had been in place since 2003. Carlton senior- and rookie-listed players who were not selected to play in the Carlton team were eligible to play for either the Northern Blues seniors or reserves team in the Victorian Football League. The club's nine home matches were split with six matches at the VFL club's traditional home ground Preston City Oval, and three matches at Carlton's traditional home ground Ikon Park. The Northern Blues finished 9th out of 15 in the VFL with a record of 8–10 to miss the finals on percentage by 8.1%pts.

References

Carlton Football Club seasons
Carlton
Carlton